Rade Karanfilovski (born 3 July 1968) is a retired Macedonian football midfielder, who last played for FK Madžari Solidarnost, which was recently managed.

International career
He made his senior debut for Macedonia in an October 1995 European Championship qualification match against Cyprus and has earned a total of 8 caps, scoring 1 goal. His final international was an October 2000 FIFA World Cup qualification match against Moldova.

References

External sources

1968 births
Living people
Association football midfielders
Macedonian footballers
North Macedonia international footballers
FK Sileks players
FK Pobeda players
FK Madžari Solidarnost players
Macedonian First Football League players
Macedonian Second Football League players